Lorie A. Fridell is an American criminologist known for her research on police, especially regarding racial profiling. She is an associate professor in the Department of Criminology at the University of South Florida (USF), where she has taught since 2005. She was previously the research director at the Police Executive Research Forum for six years (1999-2005). She is the co-editor-in-chief of Policing: An International Journal of Police Strategies & Management, along with her USF colleague Wesley Jennings.

Education
Fridell was educated at Linfield College (B.A. in psychology, 1980) and the University of California, Irvine (M.A. and Ph.D. in social ecology in 1983 and 1987, respectively).

Work
Fridell developed the "Fair & Impartial Policing" training program to help police recognize and reduce their own implicit biases. The program aims to convince police officers that policing practices influenced by such biases are counterproductive and unjust. She has produced curriculums about these programs with funding from the United States Department of Justice, and has distributed them to police officers and to their first-line supervisors.

References

External links
Faculty page

American criminologists
American women criminologists
American women editors
Living people
University of South Florida faculty
Linfield University alumni
University of California, Irvine alumni
Academic journal editors
Year of birth missing (living people)